Sulfur is used in pharmaceutical skin preparations for the treatment of acne and other conditions. it acts as a keratolytic agent and also kills bacteria, fungi, scabies mites and other parasites.

Chemically, it is the naturally occurring octasulfur (S8).

Forms and uses

 Flower of sulfur or sublimed sulfur (Latin: sulfur sublimatum) is the naturally occurring, unpurified form. It comes in yellow flakes and has been used in traditional and alternative medicine for humans and animals, as well as in alchemy and sulfuring fruit before drying.
 Purified sulfur (sulfur depuratum) is prepared by washing sublimed sulfur with ammonia. It is a fine yellow powder. It was formerly used as a laxative, but this application is rare today.
 Precipitated sulfur (sulfur praecipitatum) is prepared by boiling sulfur and calcium oxide in water and then precipitating with hydrochloric acid. It, too, is a fine yellow powder.
 Colloidal sulfur (sulfur colloidale) is an extremely fine sulfur powder prepared by repeated precipitation, first from polysulfides with protein and then from a slightly alkaline solution with ethanol or acetone. It has a greyish-white colour. Colloidal solutions in water are milky, and bluish when viewed against the light due to the Tyndall effect.

Topical uses
Precipitated sulfur and colloidal sulfur are used, in form of lotions, creams, powders, soaps, and bath additives, for the treatment of acne vulgaris, acne rosacea, and seborrhoeic dermatitis. Other topical uses included the treatment of superficial mycoses (infections with fungi) and scabies, but this is largely obsolete now.

Adverse effects
Common adverse effects include irritation of the skin at the application site, such as dryness, stinging, itching and peeling. Generalised allergic reactions are rare; they include hives as well as swelling of lips, tongue, and throat, potentially closing up the respiratory tract.

Overdose
Ingesting more than a few grams can lead to poisoning by hydrogen sulfide (H2S), which the gut flora produces from sulfur. H2S is also generated on the skin, but topical formulations do not induce toxic concentrations except when large quantities are used for small children.

Mechanism of action
Sulfur is converted to hydrogen sulfide through reduction, partly by bacteria. H2S kills bacteria (possibly including Propionibacterium acnes which plays a role in acne), fungi, and parasites such as scabies mites. In the gut, H2S increases motility, acting as a laxative. Sulfur's keratolytic action is also mediated by H2S; in this case, the hydrogen sulfide is produced by direct interaction with the target keratinocytes themselves.

See also 
 Sulfur (general information about this chemical element)

References 

Anti-acne preparations